Fairview Township may refer to:

Arkansas
 Fairview Township, Independence County, Arkansas, in Independence County, Arkansas

Illinois
 Fairview Township, Fulton County, Illinois

Indiana
 Fairview Township, Fayette County, Indiana

Iowa
 Fairview Township, Allamakee County, Iowa
 Fairview Township, Jasper County, Iowa
 Fairview Township, Jones County, Iowa
 Fairview Township, Monona County, Iowa
 Fairview Township, Osceola County, Iowa
 Fairview Township, Shelby County, Iowa, in Shelby County, Iowa

Kansas
 Fairview Township, Barton County, Kansas
 Fairview Township, Butler County, Kansas
 Fairview Township, Cowley County, Kansas
 Fairview Township, Ford County, Kansas
 Fairview Township, Jefferson County, Kansas
 Fairview Township, Labette County, Kansas, in Labette County, Kansas
 Fairview Township, Republic County, Kansas
 Fairview Township, Russell County, Kansas
 Fairview Township, Stafford County, Kansas, in Stafford County, Kansas

Minnesota
 Fairview Township, Cass County, Minnesota
 Fairview Township, Lyon County, Minnesota

Missouri
 Fairview Township, Caldwell County, Missouri
 Fairview Township, Henry County, Missouri
 Fairview Township, Livingston County, Missouri, in Livingston County, Missouri

Nebraska
 Fairview Township, Holt County, Nebraska

North Carolina
 Fairview Township, Buncombe County, North Carolina, in Buncombe County, North Carolina

North Dakota
 Fairview Township, Sheridan County, North Dakota, in Sheridan County, North Dakota

Pennsylvania
 Fairview Township, Butler County, Pennsylvania
 Fairview Township, Erie County, Pennsylvania
 Fairview Township, Luzerne County, Pennsylvania
 Fairview Township, Mercer County, Pennsylvania
 Fairview Township, York County, Pennsylvania

South Dakota
 Fairview Township, Clay County, South Dakota, in Clay County, South Dakota
 Fairview Township, Faulk County, South Dakota, in Faulk County, South Dakota
 Fairview Township, Hanson County, South Dakota, in Hanson County, South Dakota
 Fairview Township, Lincoln County, South Dakota, in Lincoln County, South Dakota
 Fairview Township, Mellette County, South Dakota, in Mellette County, South Dakota
 Fairview Township, Pennington County, South Dakota, in Pennington County, South Dakota

Township name disambiguation pages